Álvaro Guerrero (born 26 March 1949 in Mexico City, Mexico) is a Mexican actor, best known for his role as "Daniel" in the 2000 film Amores Perros. He appeared as a Jesuit in the Warner Bros. 1986 drama film The Mission, which marked his first film appearance.

Selected filmography
 La Civil (2021)

External links

Mexican male film actors
Mexican male telenovela actors
Mexican male television actors
Living people
Male actors from Mexico City
1949 births
20th-century Mexican male actors